Modern Greek military ranks are based on Ancient Greek and Byzantine terminology.

In the army and air force, these names are often based on the unit or post that a holder of each rank usual commands.

Air Force 
The Hellenic Air Force, is the youngest of the three services (founded in 1930). Its insignia are based on the British Royal Air Force, while it uses Army rank titles when translated to English.

Officer ranks

NCO and other ranks

Army

Officer ranks

NCO and other ranks

Navy

Officer ranks

NCO and other ranks

See also 
 Military of Greece
 Royal Hellenic Army Ranks
 Royal Hellenic Navy rank insignia
 Royal Hellenic Air Force ranks

Notes

References

External links 
 Hellenic Airforce Ranks, Hellenic Air Force website
 Διακριτικά Ελληνικού Στρατού (Hellenic Army Insignia), Hellenic Army website
 Διακριτικά Βαθμών Προσωπικού ΠΝ (Hellenic Navy Personnel Rank Insignia), Hellenic Navy website

 
Military